SY Carola is a steam yacht built in 1898. She is possibly the oldest seagoing yacht in the world despite being no longer operable and used as a museum exhibit in Irvine, Scotland.

History 
Built at Scott & Sons Shipbuilding & Engineering Co. at Bowling, on the Clyde, Carola was built for personal use of the Scott family, up until 1959 when her owners sold her to a private owner. In 1964, she was then sold to a private owner, before being purchased in 1981 by a Sussex firm and used for corporate hospitality. She was sold to Plysosene of Southwater, Sussex, and extensively refitted for use as a promotional and corporate hospitality vessel. in 1994, she was then taken to the Scottish Maritime Museum to be a museum exhibit where she has resided ever since. In 2020, according to The Herald, a 3D model of the Carola is available on the Sketchfab marketplace and can be viewed on the museum's official website.

References 

 https://www.nationalhistoricships.org.uk/register/9/carola
 https://www.scottishmaritimemuseum.org/3d_collections/sy-carola/

External links 
 https://sketchfab.com/3d-models/sy-carola-0c121fdfa4f744f9851def9427d372c2

1898 ships
Ships built on the River Clyde
Museum ships in the United Kingdom
Ships preserved in museums
Steam yachts